Keith Flexmore Adams (8 September 1926 – 5 April 2012) was an Australian filmmaker and adventurer.

Adams was born in Scottsdale, Tasmania. In 1955, Adams filmed an amateur production tilted Northern Safari (1956), in which he, his wife Audrey, his sister Margaret, and Tiger, a Smooth Fox Terrier, travelled in a 1948 Buick from their home in Perth, Western Australia, across the Gibson Desert to the Gulf of Carpentaria. Adams predated several Australian adventurers by decades, such as Malcolm Douglas, the Leyland Brothers, Harry Butler, Les Hiddins (The Bush Tucker Man), Paul Hogan's fictional Crocodile Dundee and Steve Irwin. He presented his film throughout Australia and several overseas countries.

Adams' autobiography, Crocodile Safari Man: My Tasmanian Childhood in the Great Depression & 50 Years of Desert Safaris to the Gulf of Carpentaria 1949 – 1999, was published in 2000.

Adams died at age 85 on 5 April 2012 in the Perth suburb of Karrinyup.

References

External links
Crocodile Safari Man
Northern Safari (16mm)

1926 births
2012 deaths
Australian autobiographers
Australian film directors
People from Tasmania